John Matthews (born December 27, 1951) is an American wrestler. He competed in the men's Greco-Roman 74 kg at the 1976 Summer Olympics. He began wrestling at age 12, with the hope of one day being an Olympic wrestler.

References

1951 births
Living people
American male sport wrestlers
Olympic wrestlers of the United States
Wrestlers at the 1976 Summer Olympics
Sportspeople from Flint, Michigan
Pan American Games medalists in wrestling
Pan American Games gold medalists for the United States
Wrestlers at the 1979 Pan American Games
Medalists at the 1979 Pan American Games
20th-century American people
21st-century American people